Jorge Cubero Gálvez (born 6 November 1992) is a Spanish former professional cyclist, who rode professionally for UCI ProTeam  between 2016 and 2020. In August 2018, he was named in the startlist for the Vuelta a España.

After retiring, Cubero intended to pursue a career as a civil engineer.

Major results
2018
 Vuelta a España
 Combativity award, Stages 6 & 8
2019
  Combativity award Stage 4 Vuelta a España

Grand Tour general classification results timeline

References

External links

1992 births
Living people
Spanish male cyclists
Spanish civil engineers
Sportspeople from the Province of Córdoba (Spain)
Cyclists from Andalusia